Inge Koch may refer to:
 Inge Koch (figure skater)
 Inge Koch (statistician)